In employment, workforce not necessary for the operation of a business are termed redundant. "Redundancy" may refer to specific legal concepts:

Redundancy in United Kingdom law concerns the rights of employees if they are dismissed due to the requirements of the business for the work they do ceasing or diminishing
Voluntary redundancy
A synonym to "layoff" (chiefly UK, Australia, New Zealand)